Last Chance U is an American documentary streaming television series that is produced and premiered by Netflix. The six-episode first season explores the football program at East Mississippi Community College, which features several collegiate athletes that have had trouble in their lives and struggled with finding structure. The players are then required to perform at the junior college (JUCO) level, under the stewardship of coach Buddy Stephens, in order to prove themselves and return to Division I.

The series' second season returned to Mississippi, but transitioned to Independence Community College in Kansas for the show's third season, which premiered on July 21, 2018. This was followed by a return to Independence for the fourth season; it debuted on July 19, 2019. The final season took place at Laney College in Oakland, California and premiered on July 28, 2020. In 2020, it was announced that a scripted drama based on the first two seasons would be produced by and starring Courteney Cox.

Synopsis
The first two seasons focus on all aspects of the football program at East Mississippi Community College, one of the most successful JUCO programs in the country. Major themes include the academic struggles of the players – some of whom have come from severely disadvantaged backgrounds. This is set against an overall redemption and coming-of-age “last chance” theme for the group  of men struggling to find their place. Team academic advisor Brittany Wagner is featured prominently as she is tasked with getting all team members to graduate on time. Head coach Buddy Stephens' struggles with controlling his temper is also a major theme, which is often juxtaposed with his devout Christian faith that he attempts to impart on the team.

Season 1
The crew followed the EMCC Lions during their 2015 season as they attempted to capture their fourth JUCO national title. While the team appeared dominant for much of the year, their season was derailed after a brawl broke out during their game with Mississippi Delta. EMCC was disqualified from the state playoffs and a potential berth to the national championship game.

Ranking: NJCAA released prior to game.

Season 2
Netflix returned to Scooba to follow their 2016 season. Once again holding national championship aspirations, the team faced a major hurdle in that only 32 of their players were eligible for their opening game with Jones County Junior College due to suspensions related to the previous season's brawl. EMCC lost that game, 27–25, their first season-opening loss since 2010. The Lions would go on to win the rest of their games, but were left out of the national championship game when they finished the season ranked No. 3 in the polls.

Ranking: NJCAA released prior to game.

Season 3
Despite being invited back to EMCC for a third season, producers decided to move the show to Independence Community College of Kansas.  The new location is different in that ICC has historically had much lower expectations than EMCC; in 2016, it ended the season 5–4, its first winning season in ten years.  The ICC Pirates had a very successful recruiting campaign for the 2017 season, landing many acclaimed players who began at NCAA Division I schools.
Jeff Carpenter, the long-time Voice of the Indy Pirates delivers the back story of the team and the town of Independence, KS.

Ranking: NJCAA released prior to game.

Season 4
The fourth season continues in Independence, where the team fails to live up to high preseason expectations, finishing 2–8. After the season, Coach Brown is forced to resign for insensitive remarks. The season received the 2020 Emmy Award for Outstanding Serialized Sports Documentary.

Ranking: NJCAA released prior to game.

Season 5
The fifth season takes place in Oakland, California at Laney College alongside football head coach John Beam. It premiered in July 2020.

Episodes

Series overview

Season 1 (2016)

Season 2 (2017)

Season 3 (2018)

Season 4 (2019)

Season 5 (2020)

Reception
The series was given a positive review by SB Nations Jason Kirk, who summed it up as a "carefully crafted drama with personalities to care about." Critical aggregator website Metacritic awarded the series a score of 79, indicating "generally favorable reviews".

Featured staff

EMCC
 Buddy Stephens (head coach)
 Brittany Wagner (academic advisor)
 Marcus Wood (offensive coordinator)
 Davern Williams (defensive line coach)
 Ed Holly (defensive coordinator, season 2)
 Clint Trickett (quarterbacks coach)
 Cade Wilkerson (running backs coach)
 Jordan Lesley (defensive coordinator, season 1)

ICC
 Jason Brown (head coach)
 Jason Martin (defensive coordinator, secondary coach)
 Kiyoshi Harris (offensive coordinator, offensive line coach)
 Frank Diaz (quarterback coach)
 Raechal Martin (head athletic trainer)
 Tammy Geldenhuys (athletic director)
 Latonya Pinkard (English teacher, associate professor)
 Mark Harris (Sociology Professor)
Heather Mydosh (English teacher)
 Daniel Barwick (president)
 Jeff Carpenter (voice of the Pirates)

Laney
 John Beam (head coach, athletic director)
 Josh Ramos (defensive coordinator, assistant head coach)
 Jeff Haagenson (offensive coordinator)
 Kevin Evans (offensive line coach)
 Bryan Coughlan (defensive line coach)
 Vince Bordelon (outside linebackers coach/pass rush specialist) (Uncredited)
 Rob Crowley (quarterback coach)
 Adam Robinson (wide receivers coach)
 Derrick Gardner (cornerbacks coach)
 Rick Becker (athletic trainer)

Players

Crew
Benjamin Cotner – executive producer
Edgar Doumerc – sound department
Joe Labracio – executive producer
Adam Leibowitz – producer
Lisa Nishimura – executive producer
Dawn Ostroff – executive producer
Adam Ridley – producer, director, editor
Jihan Robinson – executive producer
James D. Stern – executive producer
Lucas Smith – executive producer
Greg Whiteley – director, executive producer
Sam Young – sound department
Yuri Tománek – original music
Joseph Minadeo – original music

Last Chance U: Basketball (spin-off series) 
On March 10, 2021, a spin-off series Last Chance U: Basketball premiered on Netflix, introducing a new sport for the award-winning documentary series to follow. The eight-episode first season explores the basketball program at East Los Angeles College, which features a once faltering junior college team that has become a title contender under head coach John Mosley. Through his strong convictions, Coach Mosley leads young men who hope to fulfill their major college potential. On September 10, 2021, the series was renewed for a second season. The second season premiered on December 13, 2022.

Synopsis 
Mosley's Huskies enjoyed their best season in ELAC history during the 2019–20 season. The team had their eyes on the CCCAA State Title, entering the Championship Tournament with a program-best 29–1 record while being ranked the second-best team in the state. Their season was cancelled, however, due to the COVID-19 pandemic.

Featured staff

ELAC 
 John Mosley (head coach)
 Kenneth Hunter (assistant coach)
 Frankie Aguilar (assistant coach)
 Robert Robinson (assistant coach)
 Eric Guzman (team manager)
 Bianca Lopez (team manager)

Players

Episodes

Season 1 (2021)

Season 2 (2022)

References

See Also	
Hoop Dreams

External links

EMCC athletics
ICC athletics

2010s American documentary television series
2015 in American football
2015 in Mississippi
2016 American television series debuts
2016 in American football
2016 in Mississippi
2017 in American football
2017 in Kansas
2020 American television series endings
2020s American documentary television series
American football in Kansas
American football in Mississippi
College football television series
East Mississippi Community College
Netflix original documentary television series
Television series by Boardwalk Pictures
Television series set in 2015
Television series set in 2016
Television series set in 2017